Acceptance Speech may refer to:

 Acceptance Speech (Hip Hop Pantsula album), 2007
 Acceptance Speech (Dance Gavin Dance album), 2013
 Public speaking